The 2022–23 Yale Bulldogs women's basketball team represented Yale University during the 2022–23 NCAA Division I women's basketball season. The Bulldogs, led by first-year head coach Dalila Eshe, played their home games at John J. Lee Amphitheater of the Payne Whitney Gymnasium as members of the Ivy League. They finished the season at 13–14, 7–7 in Ivy League play to finish in fifth place. The Bulldogs failed to qualify for the Ivy League women's tournament.

Previous season
Yale finished the previous season 16–11, 9–5 in Ivy League play to finish in third place. They qualified for the 2022 Ivy League women's basketball tournament but lost to Columbia in the semifinals.

Roster

Schedule

|-
!colspan=9 style=| Non-conference regular season

|-
!colspan=9 style=| Ivy League regular season

See also
 2022–23 Yale Bulldogs men's basketball team

References

Yale
Yale Bulldogs women's basketball seasons
Yale Bulldogs
Yale Bulldogs